William M. Blaine (died 1905) was an American football player and coach. He served as the head football coach at South Dakota State University in 1905, compiling a record of 2–3. Blaine played college football at the University of Kansas, lettering in 1896. Blaine died just one week after the football season ended in 1905.

Head coaching record

References

Year of birth missing
1905 deaths
19th-century players of American football
Kansas Jayhawks football players
South Dakota State Jackrabbits football coaches